Yord-e Jamal (also Romanized as Yord-e Jamāl; also known as Yūrd-e Jamāl) is a village in Balesh Rural District, in the Central District of Darab County, Fars Province, Iran. At the 2006 census, its population was 197, in 43 families.

References 

Populated places in Darab County